The rotating-wave approximation is an approximation used in atom optics and magnetic resonance. In this approximation, terms in a Hamiltonian that oscillate rapidly are neglected. This is a valid approximation when the applied electromagnetic radiation is near resonance with an atomic transition, and the intensity is low.

The name of the approximation stems from the form of the Hamiltonian in the interaction picture, as shown below. By switching to this picture the evolution of an atom due to the corresponding atomic Hamiltonian is absorbed into the system ket, leaving only the evolution due to the interaction of the atom with the light field to consider. It is in this picture that the rapidly oscillating terms mentioned previously can be neglected. Since in some sense the interaction picture can be thought of as rotating with the system ket only that part of the electromagnetic wave that approximately co-rotates is kept; the counter-rotating component is discarded.

The rotating-wave approximation is closely related to, but different from, the secular approximation.

Mathematical formulation 
Let the energy difference between the states be  so that  is the transition frequency of the system. Then the unperturbed Hamiltonian of the atom can be written as

 .

Suppose the atom experiences an external classical electric field of frequency , given by
; e.g., a plane wave propagating in space.  Then under the dipole approximation the interaction Hamiltonian between the atom and the electric field can be expressed as

 ,

where  is the dipole moment operator of the atom.  The total Hamiltonian for the atom-light system is therefore   The atom does not have a dipole moment when it is in an energy eigenstate, so   This means that defining  allows the dipole operator to be written as

 

(with  denoting the complex conjugate).  The interaction Hamiltonian can then be shown to be

 

To see why the  terms are called counter-rotating consider a unitary transformation to the interaction or Dirac picture where the transformed Hamiltonian  is given by

 

where  is the detuning between the light field and the atom.

Making the approximation 

This is the point at which the rotating wave approximation is made.  The dipole approximation has been assumed, and for this to remain valid the electric field must be near resonance with the atomic transition.  This means that  and the complex exponentials multiplying  and  can be considered to be rapidly oscillating.  Hence on any appreciable time scale, the oscillations will quickly average to 0.  The rotating wave approximation is thus the claim that these terms may be neglected and thus the Hamiltonian can be written in the interaction picture as

 

Finally, transforming back into the Schrödinger picture, the Hamiltonian is given by

Another criterion for rotating wave approximation is the weak coupling condition, that is, the Rabi frequency should be much less than the transition frequency.

At this point the rotating wave approximation is complete.  A common first step beyond this is to remove the remaining time dependence in the Hamiltonian via another unitary transformation.

Derivation 

Given the above definitions the interaction Hamiltonian is

 

as stated.  The next step is to find the Hamiltonian in the interaction picture, . The required unitary transformation is

 ,

We now have

 

Now we apply the RWA by eliminating the counter-rotating terms as explained in the previous section, and finally transform the approximate Hamiltonian  back to the Schrödinger picture:

 

The atomic Hamiltonian was unaffected by the approximation, so the total Hamiltonian in the Schrödinger picture under the rotating wave approximation is

References

Atomic, molecular, and optical physics
Chemical physics